Maraşlı may refer to:

Places

Turkey 
 Maraşlı, Çaykara
 Maraşlı, Karaisalı

Arts, entertainment, and media

Television
 Maraşlı (2021 TV series), a Turkish show